

The Roe II Triplane, sometimes known as the Mercury, was an early British aircraft and the first product of the Avro company. It was designed by Alliott Verdon Roe as a sturdier development of his wood-and-paper Roe I Triplane. Two examples were built, one as a display machine for Roe's new firm, and the second was sold to W. G. Windham. The longest recorded flight made by the Roe II Triplane was 600 ft (180 m).

Specifications

See also

Notes

References
 
 
 
 

1910s British experimental aircraft
Roe II Triplane
Triplanes
Single-engined tractor aircraft
Aircraft first flown in 1910